ZeroTier Inc. is a software company with a freemium business model based in Irvine, California. ZeroTier provides proprietary software, SDKs and commercial products and services to create and manage virtual software-defined networks. The company's flagship end-user product ZeroTier One is a client application that enables devices such as PCs, phones, servers and embedded devices to securely connect to peer-to-peer virtual networks.

Software tools
ZeroTier markets proprietary tools, which are licensed under a Business Source License 1.1, intended to support the development and deployment of virtual data centers:

In 2021, the product line consists of the following tools:
 ZeroTier One, first released in 2014, is a portable client application that provides connectivity to public or private virtual networks.
 Central, a web-based UI portal for managing virtual networks.
 libzt (SDK), a linkable library that provides the functionality of ZeroTier One but that can be embedded in applications or services.
 LF (pronounced "aleph"), a fully decentralized fully replicated key/value store.

Client 
The ZeroTier client is used to connect to virtual networks previously created in the ZeroTier Central web-based UI. Endpoint connections are peer-to-peer and end-to-end encrypted. STUN and hole punching are used to establish direct connections between peers behind NAT. Direct connection route discovery is made with the help of a global network of root servers via a mechanism similar to ICE in WebRTC.

Controller 
Virtual networks are created and managed using a ZeroTier controller. Management is done using an API, proprietary web-based UI (ZeroTier Central), open-source web-based or CLI alternative.  Using root servers other than those hosted by ZeroTier Inc. is impeded by the software's license.

Security
The following considerations apply to ZeroTier's use as an SDWAN or VPN application:
 Asymmetric public key encryption is Curve25519, a 256-bit elliptic curve variant.
 All traffic is encrypted end to end on OSI layer 1 using 256-bit Salsa20 and authenticated using the Poly1305 message authentication (MAC) algorithm. MAC is computed after encryption (encrypt-then-MAC) and the cipher/MAC composition used is identical to the NaCl reference implementation.

Packages
ZeroTier One is available on multiple platforms and in multiple forms: 
 Microsoft Windows installer (.msi)
 Apple Macintosh (.pkg) 
 iOS for iPhone/iPad/iPod
 Docker
 Source code on GitHub
 Linux binaries (DEB & RPM)
 Linux snap package (works across distributions) 
 Linux library
 Arch Linux Community package
 Android App on Google Play
 Qnap (.qpkg)
 Synology packages (.spk)
 Western Digital MyCloud NAS EX2, EX4, EX2 Ultra (.bin)
 FreeBSD has a port and a package
 OpenWRT has a community-maintained port on GitHub
 MikroTik's RouterOS
 DynFi, a Dynamic Firewalls solution

Similar projects
 FreeLAN
 GNUnet
 IPOP
 LogMeIn Hamachi
 OpenVPN
 tinc
 WireGuard
 Netmaker
 Twingate
 Tailscale

See also
 ICE
 WebRTC
 VPN

References

External links
 TeamViewer VPN Linux-to-Windows equivalent

Virtual private networks
Anonymity networks
Tunneling software
Internet software for Linux
MacOS Internet software
Windows Internet software